Benjamin Raymond Cleverley (born 12 September 1981 in Bristol) is an English professional footballer who plays as a midfielder for Weston-super-Mare. He played for Bristol City and Cheltenham Town in the Football League.

Cleverley began his career with Bristol City and was released in 2004 having come through the youth team at Ashton Gate.

On his release by Bristol City, Cleverley linked up with Cheltenham Town and after just a season at Whaddon Road Cleverley was released in May 2004. He then signed for Conference National outfit Forest Green Rovers of whom he had spent four months on loan whilst contracted with Bristol City. Forest Green boss Colin Addison had also attempted to sign Cleverley permanently after he had been released by Bristol City.

Despite impressing in his spell at Forest Green, Cleverley was shipped out on loan to Bath City in December 2004. And at the end of his contract Cleverley was released in April 2005 along with five other players from his contract with Forest Green.

Cleverley then linked up with Paulton Rovers for his first spell with the club and he spent four years at Paulton before leaving in 2009 for Tiverton Town. Later that year however Cleverley was on the move again as he linked up with Conference South side Weston-super-Mare but he re-joined Paulton Rovers at the end of the season.

On 2 September 2011, Cleverley returned to Weston-super-Mare. After spending the rest of the season with Weston, in August 2012, Cleverley left the club to join Western League outfit Shepton Mallet as a player and assistant manager.

References

External links

1981 births
Living people
Footballers from Bristol
English footballers
Association football midfielders
Bristol City F.C. players
Forest Green Rovers F.C. players
Cheltenham Town F.C. players
Bath City F.C. players
Paulton Rovers F.C. players
Tiverton Town F.C. players
Weston-super-Mare A.F.C. players
Shepton Mallet F.C. players
English Football League players
National League (English football) players